| top point scorer =  Gaëtan Germain (Brive)319 points
| top try scorer   =  Timoci Nagusa (Montpellier)16 tries
| website          = www.lnr.fr
| prevseason       = 2014–15
| nextseason       = 2016–17
}}
The 2015–16 Top 14 competition was a French domestic rugby union club competition operated by the Ligue Nationale de Rugby (LNR). Two new teams from the 2014–15 Pro D2 season were promoted to Top 14 this year, Agen and Pau in place of the two relegated teams, Bayonne and Lyon. Home-and-away play began on 22 August 2015 and ended on 23 May 2016. This was followed by a playoff stage involving the top six teams, culminating in the final on 24 June 2016 at the Camp Nou in Barcelona, Spain. The final was moved from its traditional site of the Stade de France in Saint-Denis because of a scheduling conflict with UEFA Euro 2016.

Having defeated Toulouse and table-topping Clermont en route to the final, Racing 92 won their sixth French championship title, and first since 1990, with a 29–21 win over Toulon, despite playing over three-quarters of the game with 14 men after scrum-half Maxime Machenaud was sent off for a dangerous tackle on Matt Giteau.

Teams

Competition format
The top six teams at the end of the regular season (after all the teams played one another twice, once at home, once away) enter a knockout stage to decide the Champions of France.  This consists of three rounds: the teams finishing third to sixth in the table play quarter-finals (hosted by the third and fourth placed teams).  The winners then face the top two teams in the semi-finals, with the winners meeting in the final, held this season at Camp Nou because the traditional site of Stade de France was not available in 2015–16 due to conflict with UEFA Euro 2016.

The LNR uses a slightly different bonus points system from that used in most other rugby competitions. It trialled a new system in 2007–08 explicitly designed to prevent a losing team from earning more than one bonus point in a match, a system that also made it impossible for either team to earn a bonus point in a drawn match. LNR chose to continue with this system for subsequent seasons.

France's bonus point system operates as follows:

 4 points for a win.
 2 points for a draw.
 1 bonus point for winning while scoring at least 3 more tries than the opponent. This replaces the standard bonus point for scoring 4 tries regardless of the match result.
 1 bonus point for losing by 5 points (or fewer). The margin had been 7 points until being changed prior to the 2014–15 season.

Table

Relegation
Normally, the teams that finish in 13th and 14th places in the table are relegated to Pro D2 at the end of the season.  In certain circumstances, "financial reasons" may cause a higher placed team to be demoted instead.  This last happened at the end of the 2009–10 season when 12th place Montauban were relegated thereby reprieving 13th place Bayonne.

Fixtures & Results
The outline fixtures schedule was announced in May 2015.

Round 1

Round 2

Round 3

Round 4

Round 5

Round 6

Round 7

Round 8

Round 9

Round 10

Round 11

Round 12

Round 13
Due to the terrorist attacks that took place in Paris on 13 November 2015, matches in the European Rugby Champions Cup and European Rugby Challenge Cup were postponed to a later date – later announced to take place on the weekend of 8–10 January 2016. This meant the fixtures that featured those teams in their respective domestic leagues, were postponed to a later date. This meant that the entire Round 13 schedule was postponed: one match was moved to mid-February, and the remaining six matches were moved to mid-March.

Round 14

Round 13 rescheduled match

Round 15

Round 16

Round 17

Round 18

Round 13 rescheduled matches

Round 19

Round 20

Round 21

Round 22

Round 23

Round 24

Round 25

Round 26

Playoffs

Semi-final Qualifiers

Semi-finals

Final
The final took place on 24 June 2016 at the Camp Nou in Barcelona, Spain. The final was moved from its traditional site of the Stade de France in Saint-Denis because of a scheduling conflict with UEFA Euro 2016.

 The attendance was a new record for any domestic club match in the sport.

Leading scorers
Note: Flags to the left of player names indicate national team as has been defined under World Rugby eligibility rules, or primary nationality for players who have not yet earned international senior caps. Players may hold one or more non-WR nationalities.

Top points scorers

Top try scorers

Attendances

By club
 Attendances do not include the semi-finals or final as these are at neutral venues.

Highest attendances

Notes

References

See also
2015–16 Rugby Pro D2 season

External links
  
  Midi Olympique

 
Top 14 seasons
 
France